Detroit 1-8-7 is an American police procedural drama series about the Detroit Police Department's leading homicide unit, created by Jason Richman for ABC. It featured an ensemble cast of actors including Michael Imperioli and James McDaniel. It ran for one season consisting of 18 episodes on ABC from September 21, 2010 to March 20, 2011. It was filmed on location in Detroit, except for the pilot, which was filmed in Atlanta.

The show's executive producer, David Zabel stated, "This is a crime show but we will explore various nooks and crannies in the communities and within that context there's a lot of opportunity to see what's positive in the city and see what's heroic about the people fighting for what's best for the city of Detroit."

The 1-8-7 of the title is a specific reference to the California Penal Code designation for homicide, which has become a slang term for murder. The Michigan Compiled Laws designation for the various forms of homicide begins at 750.

On May 13, 2011, Detroit 1-8-7 was canceled by ABC. With the cancellation, series creator Jason Richman has said he is pursuing options for the series to continue on cable television, also stating that chances for the move are "slim". It was released on DVD later that year.

Cast

Main
 Michael Imperioli as Det. Louis Fitch, a mysterious man with a troubled past who is seen as fascinatingly odd by his co-workers. His family was threatened due to a case involving a Mafia boss that he was working on as an NYPD detective. Given the ultimatum of staying or letting his family live, Detective Fitch moved from New York City to Detroit. He is reunited with his son in the seventeenth episode and kills the mob boss in the series finale.
 Natalie Martinez as Det. Ariana Sanchez, a young Hispanic woman and lifelong Detroit resident with two years in Homicide.
 Jon Michael Hill as Det. Damon Washington, a rookie detective who lives in the Detroit suburb of Taylor who joined the homicide squad in the pilot after leading his precinct in clearance rates. He has an infant son and young wife. He is shot in the gut and nearly killed by a murder suspect during his first day in homicide, but Detective Fitch killed the suspect and saved his life.
 James McDaniel as Sgt. Jesse Longford, a lifelong Detroit resident with 30 years in homicide. He has three grown daughters with his late Italian wife (evidenced by his heavy influence in Italy and the Italian language). He is a second generation Detroit police officer (his father Brent was one of the first African American police officers in Detroit). He puts in his retirement papers, and considers moving to Tuscany, but later changes his mind.
 Aisha Hinds as Lt. Maureen Mason, the head of the homicide unit with 15 years in Homicide. She has two young teenage daughters.
 D. J. Cotrona as Det. John Stone, a young detective who transferred from working undercover narcotics to homicide in the first episode. The seventeenth episode begins with confirmation that he died from the gunshot wounds he suffered from a drug addicted ex-girlfriend at the end of "Stone Cold".
 Shaun Majumder as Det. Vikram Mahajan, a confirmed bachelor. His parents in India have an arranged marriage started for him. He has seven years experience in homicide.
 Erin Cummings as Dr. Abbey Ward, the Wayne County Medical Examiner.

Recurring
The following characters appeared in several episodes:
Megan Dodds as Special Agent Jess Harkins, a young FBI agent from the White Collar Crime division who moves from Chicago and joins the squad midway through the series to gain experience in homicide investigations.
Kristina Apgar as Riley Sullivan, Detective Stone's junkie ex-girlfriend who kills him after he evicts her from his apartment. She is then killed by Detective Sanchez.
Ron Heisler as Detective Chuck Brown, friend of Detective Washington from his Narcotics division days
Tessa Thompson as Lauren Washington, Detective Washington's wife.
Rochelle Aytes as Alice Williams, a young prosecuting attorney who is murdered midway through the series.
Erin Way as Wendy Chapin-Lomeister, a criminal justice student who interns at the homicide bureau midway through the series
Jefferson Mays as Dr Roger Kosowski, a psychiatrist.
Vadim Imperioli as Bobby Fitch, Detective Fitch's preteen son. (Played by real-life son of Michael Imperioli, who plays Detective Fitch).
Mo McRae as Pooch, a drug dealer the detectives arrest, who later returns as a confidential informant.
R. Ernie Silva as Chito, a drug dealer and acquaintance of Pooch who is twice arrested by the detectives during the series.
Tommy Flanagan as Albert Stram, a mobster from New York City who blackmailed Fitch into leaving the NYPD. He comes to Detroit and continues to threaten Fitch and his family, but Fitch kills him in the series finale.

Unnamed recurring characters

The following unnamed characters appeared in several episodes:
Pennie Marie-Hawkins, Steven Hauptman, and Nicholas Ritz as unnamed patrol officers who appeared at homicide scenes in every episode.
Randall Bruce, Morris Lee Sullivan, Robin E. Silas, and Zach Stewart as unnamed detectives.
Anne Keeble as Lt. Mason's secretary.
Tiffany Tremblay as the homicide division's receptionist.
Steven Schoolmeesters as Dr. Ward's assistant.
Alicia McGill as a WXYZ-TV news reporter.

Episodes

Production
On November 6, 2009 ABC picked up five new projects from Mandeville Films which included Detroit 1-8-7, at the time called "187 Detroit". ABC ordered the pilot of Detroit 1-8-7 on January 4, 2010. Jon Michael Hill was the first person cast for the show in late January. Nellie Andreeva, then of The Hollywood Reporter, reported on January 27, 2010 that the lead role in Detroit 1-8-7 had been offered to British actor Jason Isaacs. Aisha Hinds, Natalie Martinez, and D.J. Cotrona were all cast in February 2010. It was announced on night of March 2, 2010 that Michael Imperioli joined the cast of Detroit 1-8-7. Three days later it was announced that James McDaniel, Shaun Majumder, and Erin Cummings had been cast in the remaining principal roles of Detroit 1-8-7. The character Detective Louis Fitch was originally named Joseph Fitch and the Wayne County Medical Examiner's name was Dr. Hailey Cork in the pilot. The pilot was filmed in Atlanta, Georgia in March 2010.

On May 18, 2010 it was confirmed that ABC had picked up Detroit 1-8-7 for the 2010–11 TV season.
Although the pilot episode was shot in Atlanta, the series is filmed in Detroit. Originally planned as a mockumentary, ABC decided to abandon the format after the Detroit Police Department suspended real-life documentary ridealongs by camera crews after a controversial police shooting during filming of the A&E documentary series The First 48. The casting call for extras in Detroit was announced on June 18, 2010. Production on the series began on July 20, 2010. Scenes from the pilot were re-shot to remove the mockumentary format before the episode aired.

There was a controversy over a single word in the script of the premiere, "soda". The character Pooch, played by Mo McRae said, "You just drunk the last of my soda."  The next morning it was a recurring topic on local radio station WDZH (98.7 AMP) about which is the proper term for soft drink in Detroit, "soda" or "pop". The winner was "pop". The character Pooch was also in the seventh episode and that time he asked for a "pop". At the end of the season 1 finale, Detective Fitch asks his son if he would like to get a Coney and soda, to which his son replies that "they don't say soda here, they say pop...everyone knows that", as Detective Fitch nods and smiles.

The series also featured real Detroit ABC affiliate WXYZ-TV, real Detroit newspaper The Detroit News, real Detroit colleges University of Detroit Mercy and Wayne State University and several Motown Records artists' music. Landmarks shown include Comerica Park, Ford Field, the Renaissance Center, and Michigan Central Station.

Music
The score is composed by Dave Kushner and John O'Brien. Detroit 1-8-7 has been noted for its usage of Motown music in its episodes. Motown music featured in Detroit 1-8-7 includes "Ball of Confusion" by The Temptations, "Higher Ground" and "Living for the City" by Stevie Wonder. The ringtone on Detective Washington's phone in the first episode is "Baby Love" by The Supremes.

List of music used in Detroit 1-8-7

Episode 1: "Pilot"
 Stevie Wonder, "Higher Ground"
 The Temptations, "Papa was a Rolling Stone"
 J Dilla, "It's Like That"
 The Black Keys, "Howlin' for You"
 Blakroc, "Done Did It"

Episode 2: "Local Hero / Overboard"
 James Brown, "The Payback"
 Aretha Franklin, "Drown in My Own Tears"

Episode 3: "Nobody's Home / Unknown Soldier"
 The Staple Singers, "I'll Take You There"
 Stevie Wonder, "Living for the City"

Episode 4: "Royal Bubbles / Needle Drop"
 Kem, "Love Never Fails"
 Big B, "Hot Woman"
 Rahsaan Patterson, "Oh Lord Take Me Back"
 Patsy Cline, "Crazy"
 Frightened Rabbit, "Yes I Would"
 The Temptations, "My Girl" (Italian version)

Episode 5: "Murder in Greektown / High School Confidential"
 Amanda Blank, "Gimme What You Got"

Episode 6: "Lost Child / Murder 101"
 John Legend and the Roots, "Compared to What"
 Mos Def, "Quiet Dog"
 Jay Dee, "Pause"
 The Black Keys, "Things Ain't Like They Used To Be"

Episode 7: "Broken Engagement / Trashman"
 Eminem, "Not Afraid"
 The Dramatics, "Whatcha See is Whatcha Get"

Episode 8: "Deja Vu / All In"
 Andre Williams, "I Don't Need Mary"
 Tara Holloway, "Temptation Took Control of Me & I Fell"
 Bohannon, "South African Man"
 Mojo Monkeys, "Girl Might Do"
 Cee Lo Green, "Die Tryin'"

Episode 9: "Home Invasion / Drive-By"
 The Heavy, "Colleen"
 Black Milk, "Keep Bouncin'"
 Obie Trice, "There They Go"

Episode 10: "Shelter"
 Sam Roberts, "Detroit '67"
 Ray Charles, "Drown in My Own Tears"
 Gil Scott Heron, "We Almost Lost Detroit This Time"

Episode 11: "Ice Man / Malibu"
 Bettye LaVette, "Joy"
 Ornette Coleman, "Rejoicing"
 Marvin Gaye, "Baby Don't You Do It"

Episode 12: "Key to the City"
 Sly & the Family Stone, "In Time"
 Black Joe Lewis & the Honeybears, "I'm Broke"

Episode 13: "Road to Nowhere"
 The Dead Weather, "Hustle and Cuss"
 Corinne Bailey Rae, "Love's on Its Way"

Episode 14: "Beaten / Cover Letter"
 Fabolous, "My Time"
 Aretha Franklin, "Soul Serenade"

Episode 15: "Legacy / Drag City"
 Cee Lo Green, "Bright Lights Bigger City"
 LaBelle, "Lady Marmalade"

Episode 16: "Stone Cold"
 Otis Redding, "I've Been Loving You Too Long"

Episode 17: "Motor City Blues"
 Gnarls Barkley, "Who's Gonna Save My Soul" (Demo Version)
 SubNoize Souljaz feat. Big B, Dirtball & Daddy X, "On Da Rize"
 Glen Hansard, "Falling Slowly"

Episode 18: "Blackout"
 Bobby Blue Band, "Ain't No Love in the Heart of the City"
 Radiohead, "Reckoner"
 Gloriæ Dei Cantores, "Three Choruses from Tsar Feodor Ioannovich : I. Bogoroditse Devo – Rejoice, O Virgin"

Broadcasting

Detroit 1-8-7 premiered on September 21, 2010 at 10:00 pm on ABC. The first season was initially to be 13 episodes. On October 25, 2010 ABC announced the order of an additional 5 episodes to bring the first season to 18 episodes.

The thirteenth episode, "Road To Nowhere", was initially scheduled for January 18, 2011 but was replaced with a 20/20 special interview with Mark E. Kelly, the husband of U.S. Congresswoman Gabby Giffords who is believed to have been the intended target in the shooting near Tucson, Arizona ten days before. The 2011 State of the Union Address was broadcast on January 25. "Road To Nowhere" was broadcast on February 1, 2011.

On February 22, 2011 an episode of Primetime: What Would You Do was shown in place of the previously scheduled sixteenth episode, "Stone Cold". A special 20/20 interview with Charlie Sheen was broadcast on March 1, 2011, again displacing "Stone Cold". "Stone Cold" was eventually broadcast on March 8. The rescheduling of previous episodes put the season finale in conflict with season 12 of Dancing with the Stars and as a result Detroit 1-8-7 was moved to Sunday, March 20 at 10:00 pm.

International distribution
Detroit 1-8-7 premiered on Fox Crime in Spain, where it is known simply as Detroit, on November 15, 2010. On November 29, 2010 Variety reported that Canal+ has acquired rights to the series and will be showing it in France beginning on January 27, 2011. Detroit 1-8-7 is shown on the national broadcast station RTÉ 2 in Ireland. In India, STAR World India began broadcasting Detroit 1-8-7 on December 14, 2010. In Australia, the Seven Network has the broadcast rights to the series, and began airing it on April 13, 2011.

DVD release
Lionsgate Home Entertainment released the complete series (labeled as "the complete first season") on DVD in Region 1 on August 30, 2011.

Reception

Critical
Detroit 1-8-7 has an average score of 63/100 on Metacritic based on 22 reviews from television critics. Robert Bianco of USA Today describes the series as the best police drama on ABC since NYPD Blue ended. Bianco says the show's best trait is its uncommon setting and that it is filmed where it is set, "which gives it an authenticity and a palpable sense of place." The New York Times'''s television critic Alessandra Stanley said the show is "a throwback to an earlier era of cop shows when steel-edged realism was still novel and there was a thrill to watching terse, streetwise detectives on shows like Dragnet and Kojak cajole witnesses and browbeat suspects."

Rob Owen of the Pittsburgh Post-Gazette found Detroit 1-8-7 brings nothing new to the police procedural genre but that it does offer strong performances from its cast. Owen further said that the drama is disappointingly generic, but expected it to appeal to die-hard fans of the genre. In his review of new shows for autumn 2010 Hank Stuever of The Washington Post gives Detroit 1-8-7 a grade of D+ and says "nothing to see here." John Doyle of The Globe and Mail called Detroit 1-8-7 "a too-conventional cop show."

Many critics point out that the ghost remnants of the show's original premise as a mockumentary can be found throughout the first episode.

James Poniewozik of Time said that "Detroit 1-8-7 does not look bad. It's more character-focused than a typical procedural and has a strong, multi-ethnic cast. And it has a sense of the city's history: an African-American cop, referencing the city's white-flight past, says he's been on the force so long that "when I started, half of the suspects were white."

John Roach, former Detroit Police Department spokesman, in speaking of the first episode, said, "I think the show portrayed Detroit's police officers as real people, dedicated, even heroic, which is entirely deserved."

Ratings
The premiere of Detroit 1-8-7 received 9.34 million viewers and 2.3/7 Adults 18–49 rating/share. The twelfth episode, "Key to the City", recorded 5.05 million viewers and a series low 1.0/3 rating/share among adults 18 to 49 years old. The following episode, "Road to Nowhere" was up to 5.6 million viewers  The series finale, "Blackout", marked a series low in viewers at 4.652 million, and a 1.1 in adults 18–49. According to Nielsen, Detroit 1-8-7 averaged 7.57 million viewers and ranked 64th for the 2010-2011 television season.

AccoladesDetroit 1-8-7 was nominated for Favorite New TV Drama at the 37th People's Choice Awards but it did not make the final cut for the five finalists.
The series was also nominated for Outstanding Drama Series at the 2011 NAACP Image Awards. Detroit 1-8-7 was also nominated for a Golden Reel Award and a Banff Rockie Award. Tom O'Neil of the Los Angeles Times said that Detroit 1-8-7'' was a possible contender for the Outstanding Drama Series Emmy and that Michael Imperioli was a possible nominee for an Outstanding Lead Actor Emmy, although neither were nominated.

References

External links

 Detroit 1-8-7 at Biz X Magazine

2010 American television series debuts
2011 American television series endings
2010s American crime drama television series
2010s American police procedural television series
American Broadcasting Company original programming
English-language television shows
Fictional portrayals of the Detroit Police Department
Television series by ABC Studios
Television shows set in Detroit